Jack Watt (19 June 1907 – 8 October 1997) was  a former Australian rules footballer who played with Footscray in the Victorian Football League (VFL).

Notes

External links 

1907 births
1997 deaths
Australian rules footballers from Victoria (Australia)
Western Bulldogs players
Preston Football Club (VFA) players